Rémi Oudin (born 18 November 1996) is a French professional footballer who plays as a striker or a left winger for  club Lecce, on loan from Bordeaux.

Club career
Oudin is a youth exponent from Reims. He made his Ligue 2 debut on 13 August 2016 against Valenciennes replacing Pablo Chavarría after 67 minutes in a 0–0 away draw.

Oudin helped Reims win the 2017–18 Ligue 2, helping promote them to the Ligue 1 for the 2018–19 season.

On 31 August 2022, Oudin joined Lecce in Italy on loan.

Career statistics

Honours
Reims
 Ligue 2: 2017–18

References

1996 births
People from Châlons-en-Champagne
Sportspeople from Marne (department)
Footballers from Grand Est
Living people
Association football forwards
French footballers
Ligue 1 players
Ligue 2 players
Championnat National 2 players
Championnat National 3 players
Serie A players
Stade de Reims players
FC Girondins de Bordeaux players
U.S. Lecce players
French expatriate footballers
Expatriate footballers in Italy
French expatriate sportspeople in Italy